Clyde H. Ray Sr. House, also known as Ten Oaks and Breese House, is a historic home located at Waynesville, Haywood County, North Carolina. It was built in 1901–1902, and is a -story, Colonial Revival style frame dwelling with Queen Anne style design elements.  It is sheathed in weatherboard and has a multi-gabled and hipped roof and two interior end brick chimneys.  Also on the property is a contributing spring house.

It was listed on the National Register of Historic Places in 2005.

References

Houses on the National Register of Historic Places in North Carolina
Queen Anne architecture in North Carolina
Colonial Revival architecture in North Carolina
Houses completed in 1900
Houses in Haywood County, North Carolina
National Register of Historic Places in Haywood County, North Carolina
Waynesville, North Carolina